Ahmet Mithat (1844 – 28 December 1912) was an Ottoman journalist, author, translator and publisher during the Tanzimat period. In his works, he was known as Ahmet Mithat Efendi, to distinguish him from the contemporary politician Midhat Pasha. Ahmet Mithat Efendi took his name from Ahmed Şefik Midhat Pasha, as he worked for a time as an official and newspaper editor in Midhat Pasha's Vilayet of the Danube.

Politically, his orientation was more moderate, compared to writers such as Namık Kemal. He was a prolific writer, more than 250 of his works have survived. From 1878 he published a newspaper entitled Tercüman-ı Hakikat (Interpreter of Truth). Before that he was one of the contributors of Basiret, a newspaper published between 1870 and 1879.

His editorship and publication of Olga Lebedeva's translations of Russian literature into Turkish served as an introduction of Tolstoy, Lermontov and Pushkin to Turkey's readership. In addition, he was a patron and teacher to Fatma Aliye, one of the most famous female Ottoman authors.

Bibliography

Novels 
 Hasan Mellâh yâhud Sır İçinde Esrar (1874)
 Dünyaya İkinci Geliş yâhut İstanbul’da Neler Olmuş (1875)
 Hüseyin Fellah (1875)
 Felâtun Bey ile Râkım Efendi (1875)
 Karı-Koca Masalı (1875)
 Paris'de Bir Türk (1876)
 Çengi (1877, oyun)
 Süleyman Musûlî (1877)
 Yeryüzünde Bir Melek (1879)
 Henüz On Yedi Yaşında (1881)
 Karnaval (1881)
 Amiral Bing (1881)
 Vah! (1882)
 Acâib-i Âlem (1882)
 Dürdâne Hanım (1882)
 Esrâr-ı Cinâyât (1884)
 Cellâd (1884)
 Volter Yirmi Yaşında (1884)
 Hayret (1885)
 Cinli Han (1885)
 Çingene (1886)
 Demir Bey yâhud İnkişâf-ı Esrâr (1887)
 Fennî Bir Roman Yâhud Amerika Doktorları (1888)
 Haydut Montari (1888)
 Arnavutlar-Solyotlar (1888)
 Gürcü Kızı yâhud İntikam (1888)
 Nedâmet mi? Heyhât (1889)
 Rikalda yâhut Amerika'da Vahşet Âlemi (1889)
 Aleksandr Stradella (1889)
 Şeytankaya Tılsımı (1889)
 Müşâhedât (1890)
 Ahmed Metin ve Şîrzât (1891)
 Bir Acîbe-i Saydiyye (1894)
 Taaffüf (1895)
 Gönüllü (1896)
 Eski Mektûblar (1897)
 Mesâil-i Muğlaka (1898)
 Altın Âşıkları (1899)
 Hikmet-i Peder (1900)
 Jön Türkler (1910)

Stories 
 Kıssadan Hisse (1870)
 Letâif-i rivayat (Notes: The first story in Turkish literature.)

References

1844 births
1912 deaths
19th-century writers from the Ottoman Empire
Turkish novelists